Oltion is a surname and given name.

Surname
Notable people with this surname include:
Jerry Oltion (born 1957), American writer
Kathy Oltion, American writer

Given name
Oltion is an Albanian male given name. Notable people with this name include:
Oltion Luli (born 1969), Albanian athlete
Oltion Osmani (born 1972), Albanian football player
Oltion Rapa (born 1989), Albanian football player

Albanian masculine given names